Nicolas Marceau (born June 23, 1964) is a Canadian economist, university professor, politician and former Minister of Finance. He was previously a professor of economics at the Université du Québec à Montréal.

He was elected to the National Assembly of Quebec in a by-election on September 21, 2009, representing the electoral district of Rousseau as a member of the Parti Québécois. He was named minister of finance and the economy in September 2012 after the PQ won the 2012 general election.

Personal life and education 
Marceau was born in Montreal. With roots in Quebec City, his paternal grandfather and his father, Claude, were physicians; Claude was an ENT surgeon who was friends with Parti Québécois founder René Lévesque. Nicolas and his sister lived with their mother in LeMoyne after their parents' separation when he was a young child. As a university student he worked four summers at the Île Sainte-Hélène municipal swimming pool before finding a summer job at Les Coopérants life insurance company in the internal audit department—his only experience in the financial sector before becoming Quebec's finance minister.

His education includes bachelor and master of science degrees from Université de Montréal and a doctorate from Queen's University, all in economics. His thesis supervisor was Robin Boadway.

Marceau speaks both French and English fluently. He has four daughters.

University career 
He was an economics professor at Laval University from 1992 to 1996, and at Université du Québec à Montréal from 1996 to 2009. He has published 29 articles in academic journals in the field of public economic policy, including in The American Economic Review. He won UQAM's teaching award five times, and was a co-recipient of the 2002 Harry Johnson Prize.

In 2001 he was a member of the Seguin commission which examined the possible fiscal imbalance between the federal and provincial governments.

Political career 
In June 2009 Pauline Marois asked him to run for office at a time when the PQ was looking to increase its economic credentials, following the departure of François Legault. He was elected as a member of the National Assembly of Quebec in a September 2009 by-election, and was Official Opposition critic for finance from 2010 to 2012. He became finance minister in 2012 immediately after the PQ won a minority government in the Quebec general election of 2012. His first budget brought controversy because of backing out of the party's election promise to eliminate the province's health tax. He has continued to emphasize a priority of eliminating Quebec's deficit.

References

External links
 

1964 births
Canadian economists
Finance ministers of Quebec
French Quebecers
Living people
Members of the Executive Council of Quebec
Parti Québécois MNAs
People from Lanaudière
Politicians from Montreal
Université de Montréal alumni
Academic staff of the Université du Québec à Montréal
21st-century Canadian politicians
Academic staff of Université Laval